Rubie is a surname. Notable people with the surname include:

 Anneliese Rubie (born 1992), Australian sprinter
 Brennan Rubie (born 1991), American alpine ski racer
 Claude Rubie (1888–1939), English cricketer and soldier
 Howard Rubie (1938–2011), Australian director
 Les Rubie